Satyrium eximius is a  butterfly found in the  East Palearctic that belongs to the blues family.

Subspecies
S. e. eximia Ussuri, Korea
S. e. zhejianganum    Tong, 1994    Zhejiang
S. e. mushanum  Matsumura, 1929    Taiwan

Description from Seitz

T. eximia Fixs. (= affinis Stgr.) (72 h). Much larger [than w-album ] ; above with a large scent-patch in the male and a red spot on the anal lobe. The red anal band of the hindwing beneath is very distinct and its continuation forwards white, the tip of the tail also thinly white, ab. fixseni Leech (72 i) differs, besides themuch more variegated underside, in the forewing above bearing the yellowish red discal spot already mentioned in the other species, and in the anal markings of the hindwing above being larger. — Both forms, eximia and fixseni fly together in Amurland, Corea, Central and West China, Mongolia and Manchuria. They occur in August and are apparently not rare.

Biology
The larva on feeds on Rhamnus diamantiaca

See also
List of butterflies of Russia

References

Satyrium (butterfly)
Butterflies described in 1887